20 Arietis is a single star in the northern constellation of Aries. 20 Arietis is the Flamsteed designation. It has an apparent visual magnitude of 5.79, which is bright enough to be just faintly visible to the naked eye as a yellow-white hued star. The star is located approximately 137 light years away from the Sun based upon parallax. It has a relatively high proper motion, traversing the celestial sphere at the rate of 0.188 arc seconds per annum. 20 Arietis is receding from the Earth with a heliocentric radial velocity of +25 km/s.

Gray et al. (2001) gave the stellar classification of 20 Arietis as F6 III-IV, matching an F-type star with spectral traits intermediate between a giant and a subgiant star. Harlan (1969) had found a less-evolved class of F6 IV-V. The star is around two billion years old with an estimated 1.5 times the mass of the Sun and two times the Sun's radius. It is spinning with a projected rotational velocity of 8.0 km/s and has a higher than solar metallicity. The star is radiating 6.6 times the luminosity of the Sun from its photosphere at an effective temperature of around 6,416 K.

References

External links
 HR 656
 Image 20 Arietis

F-type main-sequence stars
F-type subgiants
F-type giants
Aries (constellation)
Durchmusterung objects
Arietis, 20
013871
010540
0656